Sechelt/Porpoise Bay Water Aerodrome  was an aerodrome located adjacent to Sechelt, British Columbia, Canada. The airport was listed as abandoned in the 15 March 2007 Canada Flight Supplement.

Current usage
Whilst the aerodrome has been closed, the Sechelt Inlet/Porpoise Bay area is still used daily by private airline operators. Daily scheduled flights by Harbour Air leave from the Lighthouse Pub Complex at 5764 Wharf Avenue, and Sunshine Coast Air has its own separate base located at 5987 Sechelt Inlet Road.

At its peak (pre-pandemic), Harbour Air had three daily round-trip flights to each of the following water aerodromes: Nanaimo (CAC8), Vancouver Harbour (CYHC) and Vancouver International Airport (CAM9).

The Lighthouse Pub Complex also allows private owners of float planes to land their float planes for a small fee.

See also
Sechelt Aerodrome

References

Defunct seaplane bases in British Columbia
Sechelt